Wexler  is a surname of Yiddish origin. Notable people with the surname include:

In arts and entertainment

In film and television
 David Wexler (director) (born 1983), American filmmaker
 Eleonora Wexler, Argentine actress
 Haskell Wexler (1922–2015), American cinematographer and director
 Karen Wexler, fictional soap opera character
 Kim Wexler, fictional character from Better Call Saul
 Miriam Wexler, fictional character from Turning Red
 Norman Wexler (1926–1999), American screenwriter
 Paul Wexler (actor) (1929–1979), American actor
 Sy Wexler, American film maker
 Victor Raider-Wexler, American television and film actor
 Skyler Wexler, Canadian child actress

In other arts
 Aaron Wexler (born 1974), artist based in New York
 Dan Wexler, see Icon (band)
 Django Wexler, American fantasy writer
 Donald Wexler, American architect
 Elmer Wexler, American graphic designer
 Glen Wexler, American photographer
 Glenn Wexler, American contemporary artist
 Jerry Wexler (1917–2008), American music writer and producer
 Natalie Wexler, American novelist and historian
 Robert Freeman Wexler, American writer

In government and politics
 Anne Wexler (1930–2009), political advisor and lobbyist
 Leonard D. Wexler (1924-2018), American judge
 Max Wexler, Romanian Marxist activist
 Richard Wexler, American journalist and child welfare advocate
 Robert Wexler, American politician

In other fields
 Bernardo Wexler (1925–1992), chess International Master
 David B. Wexler, American law professor
 Harry Wexler (1911–1962), American meteorologist
 Jacqueline Grennan Wexler (1926-2012), American academic administrator
 Jerrold Wexler (1924–1992), American businessman
 Joan Wexler (born 1946), American Dean and President of Brooklyn Law School
 Nancy Wexler, geneticist, contributor to the identification of the gene that causes Huntington's disease
 Paul Wexler (linguist), Israeli linguist
 Robert Wexler (rabbi), university president

German-language surnames
Jewish surnames
Occupational surnames